The Journal of Economic Theory is a bimonthly peer-reviewed academic journal covering the field of economic theory. Karl Shell has served as editor-in-chief of the journal since it was established in 1968. Since 2000, he has shared the editorship with Jess Benhabib, Alessandro Lizzeri, Christian Hellwig, and more recently with Alessandro Pavan, Ricardo Lagos, Marciano Siniscalchi, and Xavier Vives. The journal is published by Elsevier. In 2020, Tilman Börgers was chief editor of the journal.

Abstracting and indexing 
According to the Journal Citation Reports, the journal has a 2020 impact factor of 1.458.

See also
List of economics journals

References

External links

Economics journals
Elsevier academic journals
Publications established in 1969
English-language journals
Bimonthly journals